Dowlais Top railway station served the village of Dowlais, Glamorgan, Wales, from 1867 to 1962 on the Brecon and Merthyr Tydfil Junction Railway.

History 
The station opened on 1 August 1867 by the Brecon and Merthyr Tydfil Junction Railway. To the west of the level crossing was Dowlais Top signal box. When it heavily snowed in 1947, an RAF jet used the line to clear the snow. The station closed on 31 December 1962. The station house still survives today.

References

External links 

Disused railway stations in Merthyr Tydfil County Borough
Former Brecon and Merthyr Tydfil Junction Railway stations
Railway stations in Great Britain opened in 1867
Railway stations in Great Britain closed in 1962
1867 establishments in Wales
1962 disestablishments in Wales